The 1976–77 Edmonton Oilers season was the Oilers' fifth season of operation. The Oilers placed fourth to qualify for the playoffs, losing in the first round.

Offseason

Regular season

Final standings

Schedule and results

Playoffs

Houston Aeros 4, Edmonton Oilers 1 – Semifinals

Player statistics

Note: Pos = Position; GP = Games played; G = Goals; A = Assists; Pts = Points; +/- = plus/minus; PIM = Penalty minutes; PPG = Power-play goals; SHG = Short-handed goals; GWG = Game-winning goals
      MIN = Minutes played; W = Wins; L = Losses; T = Ties; GA = Goals-against; GAA = Goals-against average; SO = Shutouts;

Awards and records

Transactions

Draft picks
Edmonton's draft picks at the 1976 WHA Amateur Draft.

Farm teams

See also
1976–77 WHA season

References

External links

Ed
Ed
Edmonton Oilers seasons